Simon Niger is a person in the Book of Acts in the New Testament. He is mentioned in Acts 13:1 as being one of the "prophets and teachers" in the church of Antioch: 

The nickname Niger is interpreted by some to mean "black", referring to a dark complexion or African descent, since niger is the Latin word for black.

Some commentators identify Simon as the same person as Simon of Cyrene, and Simon's son Rufus as the same person as Rufus named in Romans 16.

References

Christian saints from the New Testament
People in Acts of the Apostles
Prophets of the New Testament